Carter Ferguson is a fight choreographer, mental health advocate and podcaster. As a director, his 1st feature film Fast Romance won the Audience Award, voted for by the public, at the 2011 British Academy Scotland Awards. The film also screened at the 2011 edition of the Edinburgh International Film Festival.

Filmography
Carter has directed fight sequences on over 800 productions and works mostly in Scotland. Recent credits include Guilt, River City, Shetland and The Nest.

Awards

References

External links

Cater Ferguson Official Website

Scottish film directors
British stunt performers
20th-century Scottish male actors
21st-century Scottish male actors
Scottish male film actors
Scottish stunt performers
Living people
Year of birth missing (living people)